The Remains of Tom Lehrer is a box set containing all the songs from musical satirist Tom Lehrer's previous albums along with previously unreleased songs and his works featured on the public television show The Electric Company. Some of the songs from his debut album, Songs by Tom Lehrer, were re-recorded for the CD.  The box set was released in 2000 and also includes a booklet with an introduction by Dr. Demento, pictures of various album covers and song books, reprints of the Mad magazine, prints of some of his songs, an extensive question-and-answer session and other information.

In 2020, Lehrer donated all of his lyrics and music written by him to the public domain. He followed this on November 1, 2022 with all recording and performing rights of any kind, making all of his music that he has originally composed or performed free for anyone to use.

Track listing

Disc 1 
 Fight Fiercely, Harvard
 The Old Dope Peddler
 Be Prepared
 The Wild West Is Where I Want to Be
 I Wanna Go Back to Dixie
 Lobachevsky
 The Irish Ballad
 The Hunting Song
 My Home Town
 When You Are Old and Gray
 I Hold Your Hand in Mine
 The Wiener Schnitzel Waltz
 Poisoning Pigeons in the Park
 Bright College Days
 A Christmas Carol
 The Elements
 Oedipus Rex
 In Old Mexico
 Clementine
 It Makes a Fellow Proud to Be a Soldier
 She's My Girl
 The Masochism Tango
 We Will All Go Together When We Go
 I Got It from Agnes
 That's Mathematics

Disc 2 
 Introduction
 I Wanna Go Back to Dixie
 The Wild West Is Where I Want to Be
 The Old Dope Peddler
 Fight Fiercely, Harvard
 Lobachevsky
 The Irish Ballad
 The Hunting Song
 My Home Town
 When You Are Old and Gray
 The Wiener Schnitzel Waltz
 I Hold Your Hand in Mine
 Be Prepared
 Poisoning Pigeons in the Park
 Bright College Days
 A Christmas Carol
 The Elements
 Oedipus Rex
 In Old Mexico
 Clementine
 It Makes a Fellow Proud to Be a Soldier
 She's My Girl
 The Masochism Tango
 We Will All Go Together When We Go

Disc 3 
 National Brotherhood Week
 MLF Lullaby
 George Murphy
 The Folk Song Army
 Smut
 Send The Marines
 Pollution
 So Long, Mom (A Song for World War III)
 Whatever Became Of Hubert?
 New Math
 Alma
 Who's Next?
 Wernher von Braun
 The Vatican Rag
 Poisoning Pigeons in the Park
 The Masochism Tango
 The Hunting Song
 We Will All Go Together When We Go
 L-Y
 Silent E
 O-U (The Hound Song)
 S-N (Snore, Sniff, And Sneeze)
 N Apostrophe T
 Selling Out
 (I'm Spending) Hanukkah in Santa Monica

References

External links

 Discography of Tom Lehrer
 A Conversation with Tom Lehrer: the full text 

Tom Lehrer albums
2000 compilation albums
2000s comedy albums
Comedy compilation albums
Rhino Records compilation albums